Love Is a Many-Splendored Thing is a 1955 Deluxe color American drama-romance film in CinemaScope. Set in 1949–50 in Hong Kong, it tells the story of a married, but separated, American reporter Mark Elliot (played by William Holden), who falls in love with a Eurasian doctor originally from China, Han Suyin (played by Jennifer Jones), only to encounter prejudice from her family and from Hong Kong society.

The film was adapted by John Patrick from the 1952 autobiographical novel A Many-Splendoured Thing by Han Suyin. The film was directed by Henry King.

The film later inspired a television soap opera in 1967, though without the hyphen in the show's title.

Summary
A widowed Eurasian doctor Han Suyin (Jones) falls in love with a married-but-separated American correspondent Mark Elliott (Holden) in Hong Kong, during the period of China's Civil War in the late 1940s. Although they find brief happiness together, she is ostracized by the greater Chinese community. After losing her position at the hospital, Suyin and her adopted daughter go to live with a friend while Mark is on an assignment during the Korean War. They write to each other constantly. She receives word that Mark was killed and she goes to visit their favorite hilltop meeting place. In his last letter, which she receives that same day, he reminds her to be grateful, no matter what happens to him, because they got to experience “that many-splendored thing” which many people never do.

Cast

 William Holden as Mark Elliott
 Jennifer Jones as Dr. Han Suyin
 Torin Thatcher as Humphrey Palmer-Jones
 Isobel Elsom as Adeline Palmer-Jones
 Murray Matheson as Dr. John Keith
 Virginia Gregg as Anne Richards
 Richard Loo as Robert Hung
 Soo Yong as Nora Hung
 Philip Ahn as Third Uncle
 Donna Martell as Suchen, Suyin's sister
 James Hong (uncredited)
 Keye Luke (uncredited)

Production
The rights to the novel were bought by David Brown of 20th Century Fox for the producer Sol C. Siegel. However, when he left the company the project was given to Buddy Adler. The screenplay struggled to get Motion Picture Production Code approval because of its themes of adultery and miscegenation.

Parts of the film were shot on location in Hong Kong by second-unit director Otto Lang, which was unusual for its time. Two weeks of location filming in Hong Kong had been completed before the final screenplay had been finished by screenwriter John Patrick. He then had to adapt the screenplay to include as many of the shots as possible.

Despite the film's romantic subject and their chemistry on the screen, Holden and Jones could barely stand each other on set. Holden was turned off by Jones' obsessive involvement with her character and complaints about her makeup (which she said made her "look old"), about her costumes and about her dialogue. Soon they were barely speaking to one another. According to Holden's biography, Jones was also generally rude and abrasive to everyone involved in the production.
Their relationship was also not helped by Jones' worries about Holden's reputation as a womanizer. Holden claimed she chewed garlic before her love scenes, which she may have done to discourage him. Once, Holden tried to make peace, offering Jones a bouquet of white roses, which she tossed back in his face.

The film was completed on time, within the planned three-months schedule.

Locations

 The former Mok residence located at 41A Conduit Road became the Foreign Correspondents' Club in 1951. In the film it is portrayed as a hospital. The building is now demolished and Realty Gardens apartment complex has occupied the site since 1970.
 The former colonial-style Repulse Bay Hotel, demolished in 1982, and now the site of The Repulse Bay apartment building.
 The Tai Pak Floating Restaurant, now part of the Jumbo Kingdom.
 The famous hill-top meeting place where the lovers used to meet was located in rural California and not in Hong Kong.

Reception
Variety characterized it as "beautiful, absorbing."

The film earned rentals of $4 million in the United States of America and Canada.

In Ireland and the Canadian province of Quebec, local censors did not like the suggestions of divorce and cut the film to make it appear that Holden was single.

Awards and nominations

Soundtrack

The music was commissioned from Sammy Fain and Paul Francis Webster as background music. It was extensively developed and woven into the film's orchestral score by Alfred Newman and his choral director Ken Darby. To make it eligible for the Best Original Song category of the Academy Awards lyrics were subsequently added.  The original lyrics were rejected by the studio so new ones were written. The resulting sentimental and upbeat song, "Love is a Many-Splendored Thing" was one of the first songs written for a movie to reach No. 1 in the charts in the same year.

The song was subsequently recorded by The Four Aces and also by Jerry Vale, Nat King Cole, Danny Williams, and Frank Sinatra, among others. Italian-language versions were recorded by Nancy Cuomo, Neil Sedaka, and Connie Francis. Francis also recorded the song with its original English lyrics, and a German-language version, Sag, weißt du denn, was Liebe ist.

The song's lyrics relate:

During the film, charged romantic moments occur on a high grassy, windswept hill in Hong Kong. In the bittersweet final scene on the hilltop, the song (heard on the sound track) recalls the earlier encounters:

The theme song won the Academy Award for Best Song, and the recording by The Four Aces went to #1 on the charts for three weeks in 1955, shortly before rock and roll became a dominant force on the charts. Newman's orchestral score, which made heavy use of Fain's tune, also received an Oscar.

Varèse Sarabande made the complete original soundtrack available on compact disc in 2002, limiting the pressing to 2,000 copies.

See also
 List of American films of 1955
 List of films set in Hong Kong

References

Bibliography

External links

 
 
 
 
 
 Song lyrics (of The Four Aces), webpage: OldieLyrics-The_Four_Aces.
 "Hong Kong as City/Imaginary in The World of Suzie Wong, Love Is a Many Splendored Thing, and Chinese Box", by Thomas Y. T. Luk, The Chinese University of Hong Kong

1955 romantic drama films
1955 films
20th Century Fox films
CinemaScope films
American romantic drama films
Films scored by Alfred Newman
Films about interracial romance
Films about journalists
Films based on Chinese novels
Films directed by Henry King
Films set in 1949
Films set in 1950
Films set in Hong Kong
Films that won the Best Costume Design Academy Award
Films that won the Best Original Score Academy Award
Films that won the Best Original Song Academy Award
Korean War films
Photoplay Awards film of the year winners
1950s English-language films
1950s American films